Kruszyn Krajeński  is a village in the administrative district of Gmina Białe Błota, within Bydgoszcz County, Kuyavian-Pomeranian Voivodeship, in north-central Poland.

The village has a population of 1,000.

Notable residents
 Gerhard Kollewe (1912-1942), Luftwaffe pilot

References

Villages in Bydgoszcz County